This article presents the theatre, film, television, video games, and audiobook credits of English actor Tim Curry, who has a diverse range of work in these media formats. His most frequent roles are villainous roles or character parts.

Stage

Live-action roles

Film

Television

Video games

Music videos

Voice roles

Film

Television

Video games

Radio

Theme park attraction

Audiobooks

References

Male actor filmographies
British filmographies